Faustina Bracci Armellini (1785–1857) was an Italian pastellist

In 1811 she became a member of the Accademia di San Luca, which preserves a self-portrait, dating to that year, in which she is seen copying a portrait of Antonio Canova by Sir Thomas Lawrence. In 1812 she married Carlo Armellini. All of her known works date to after 1800.

References

1785 births
1857 deaths
Italian women painters
19th-century Italian painters
19th-century Italian women artists
Painters from Rome
Pastel artists